Anthene sheppardi, the golden ciliate blue, is a butterfly in the family Lycaenidae. It is found in Mozambique and Zimbabwe. The habitat consists of forests.

Adults are found in the forest canopy. Both sexes have been recorded feeding from the white flowers of a shrub and are known to mud-puddle. They are on wing throughout summer.

References

Butterflies described in 1940
Anthene